Rodos Colossi RFC is a Greek rugby club in the city of Rhodes on the island of Rhodes (Rodos).

External links
Rodos Colossi RFC

Greek rugby union teams
Rhodes (city)